Day of Chaos is a story featuring science fiction character Judge Dredd, which was published in British comic 2000 AD in 2011–2012. It has the greatest number of episodes (48) and pages (289) of any Judge Dredd story. It features amongst other things Russian revenge plots, the "Chaos Bug" after which the series is named, the Dark Judges and the destruction of most of Dredd's city.

It is mostly written by John Wagner, who has said that he is "really looking forward to seeing what other writers do with what I've left them. It's a new ballgame." Al Ewing admitted that the writers were "caught on the hop slightly" despite being forewarned, as "I didn’t realise it’d [Chaos Day] be that bad."

Plot
Following the death of Byron Ambrose, the Mayor of Mega-City One, an election for a new mayor is scheduled. Hennessey, a psychic cadet judge with precognitive powers, predicts that a major catastrophe will occur on election day, and also predicts that a certain unidentified person will be murdered. At the same time an assassin called Nadia arrives in Mega-City One, intending to bring the predicted disaster about. Meeting with a group of terrorists, Nadia orders the very murder which Hennessey predicted, which once discovered adds credence to Hennessey's other predictions.

Nadia's group kidnaps scientist Elmore Yurges, a biological warfare expert who had been working on making a weaponised form of toxoplasma gondii. The natural form of the disease is not usually fatal, but Yurges's creation kills 98 to 99 per cent of those infected, within four days of exposure, during which they descend into murderous psychosis and become uncontrollably violent. Yurges's knowledge is essential to manufacture the weapon, and he and his family are abducted and taken out of the city. However Nadia herself remains behind, intending to kill Dredd in revenge for him bringing about the destruction of her home city in the Apocalypse War thirty years earlier – it emerges that Nadia is a Soviet agent from East-Meg One. In her attempt on Dredd's life, Dredd is severely wounded, but survives, while Nadia is gunned down by other judges.

Nadia had been working for Colonel Yevgeny Borisenko, an East-Meg One intelligence officer who had been blinded by the flash of the nuclear explosion which destroyed his city, and who has been planning the destruction of Dredd's city ever since. Yurges and his family are brought to him, and by threatening to torture the family, Borisenko coerces Yurges to make him a biological weapon, which Borisenko intends to unleash on Mega-City One. To trick Mega-City One into thinking they have killed Yurges and that there is no longer a threat, Borisenko feeds them disinformation, making it appear that Yurges is being held in a compound somewhere else. Mega-City One's Strategic Defence Committee decides to bomb the fake compound to oblivion, outvoting Dredd, who argues that the only way to be certain that the threat has been eliminated is to send ground troops. By bombing the compound, the only evidence that Yurges was never there is destroyed.

Meanwhile a notorious serial killer, PJ Maybe, who escaped from custody in the story immediately before Day of Chaos, is on the loose, having assumed a fake identity. On light duties due to his injuries, Dredd assigns judges Logan, Beeny and Roake to find Maybe. However during a televised debate between the election candidates, Maybe kidnaps the mayor (Ambrose's successor), murders three other election candidates, and escapes. He kills the mayor by hanging him from Byron Ambrose Bridge.

Hennessey predicts more murders, including her own but not in time to prevent it. All of her predictions prove to be correct, including the death of one of Yurges's sons while attempting to escape, and so the Judges learn that Yurges is alive. Clues in Hennessey's visions uncover his true location, and this time Dredd gets his way: the compound is raided by soldiers, accompanied by Dredd, who discovers evidence that the bio-weapon has been completed. He warns the city, which seals its borders, but Borisenko has already sent agents infected with the deadly disease – named the "Chaos Bug" – to spread the infection.

Signals intelligence leads the judges to Borisenko's location, and he is captured, but Yurges is killed. Borisenko gloats that it is too late to stop the Chaos Bug from killing everyone in the city, before he is killed by a sleeper agent. With no time to prepare a vaccine, the Judges' only hope is to intercept all the infected agents, but they fail to, and during their investigation Judge Roake is killed by an enemy agent. As the disease is incurable and causes outbursts of extreme violence in those infected, a senior judge, Judge Vass, proposes that the hundreds of affected people already quarantined should be humanely killed and buried outside the city. However Chief Judge Francisco is horrified and vetoes the idea.

The Judges' troubles are compounded when terrorists in league with Borisenko's organisation destroy the Statue of Judgement, which contains the headquarters of the Public Surveillance Unit, an essential arm of judicial control. Without the deterrent effect of being constantly monitored, the city's criminal element embark on a frenzy of looting and mayhem, until the now seriously handicapped Justice Department loses control of the streets.

As the Chaos Bug takes hold of the population, the Judges warn the citizens to report themselves if they show any signs of illness, pretending that they can be cured. This tactic is largely successful and almost contains the outbreak, until another sleeper agent, Judge Haldane, leaks Vass's plan to the press. This not only discourages infected people from coming forward, but also provokes a violent reaction from the furious citizenry, and the rioting quickly degenerates into outright civil war. Law and order break down to the point where the Judges are completely overwhelmed, and sustain heavy casualties. The Academy of Law (where all cadet judges live) is destroyed in a co-ordinated terrorist attack, killing most of the cadets and threatening the long-term future of the Justice Department itself. Taking responsibility for these events, Vass resigns. As the Chaos Bug spreads unimpeded, Haldane causes further havoc by freeing the undead Dark Judges from their captivity. True to form, the genocidal Dark Judges begin slaughtering everyone they can find (Haldane included), until in a bizarre twist of fate they are captured by PJ Maybe.

With the whole city engulfed in violence, and most of the population now infected, the chief judge realises that the city can no longer be saved, and in desperation he adopts a version of Vass's plan: those infected are to be killed, and the infected areas of the city abandoned, while certain other buildings are to be established as "safe blocks" where the uninfected citizens might survive.

After just a few days, the epidemic begins to subside as the Chaos Bug weakens, Yurges having designed it to become less potent with each onward transmission. But by this time 350 million citizens have died, either in the fighting or as a direct result of infection, out of an initial population of 400 million, and much of the city lies in ruins. With over 87 per cent of the population having died on his watch, Chief Judge Francisco resigns, and hands over power to his predecessor, Judge Hershey. Dredd warns her "The Mega-City One we knew is gone, Hershey. We have to accept that and move on."

Chapters and contributors
Except where otherwise indicated, all episodes were written by John Wagner and coloured by Chris Blythe.
 "The Further Dasterdly Deeds of PJ Maybe" (prologue story), art by Colin MacNeil, in 2000 AD #1740–1742 (2011)
 "Day of Chaos":
 "Nadia", art by Ben Willsher, in 2000 AD #1743–1749, with two episodes in #1749
 "The Fourth Faction", art by Henry Flint, in 2000 AD #1750–1751
 "Downtime", written by Michael Carroll, art by Ben Willsher, in 2000 AD #1752
 "Elusive", art by Henry Flint, in 2000 AD #1753–1758
 "The Assassination List", art by Leigh Gallagher, in 2000 AD #1759–1764 (2011–2012)
 "Eve of Destruction", art by Henry Flint, Ben Willsher and Colin MacNeil, in 2000 AD #1765–1784
 "Tea For Two", art by Edmund Bagwell, in 2000 AD #1785
 "Wot I Did duRiNg the WoRst DissasteR IN Mega-City History" (sic), art by Henry Flint, in 2000 AD #1786
 "Chaos Day", art by Henry Flint, in 2000 AD #1787–1788
 "The Days After", art by Henry Flint, in 2000 AD #1789

Trade paperbacks
"Day of Chaos" and some other related stories were reprinted in two trade paperbacks. All stories written by John Wagner.
Day of Chaos: The Fourth Faction (February 2013) collects:
"The Skinning Room", art by Ben Willsher, in 2000 AD #1700–1704 (2010)
"Hot Night in 95", art by Staz Johnson, in Judge Dredd Megazine #307–308, 310 (2011)
"The Further Dasterdly Deeds of PJ Maybe", art by Colin MacNeil, in 2000 AD #1740–1742 (2011)
 "Nadia", art by Ben Willsher, in 2000 AD #1743–1749
 "The Fourth Faction", art by Henry Flint, in 2000 AD #1750–1751
 "Elusive", art by Henry Flint, in 2000 AD #1753–1758
Day of Chaos: Endgame (July 2013)
 "The Assassination List", art by Leigh Gallagher, in 2000 AD #1759–1764 (2011–2012)
 "Eve of Destruction", art by Henry Flint, Ben Willsher and Colin MacNeil, in 2000 AD #1765–1784
 "Tea For Two", art by Edmund Bagwell, in 2000 AD #1785
 "Wot I Did duRiNg the WoRst DissasteR IN Mega-City History" (sic), art by Henry Flint, in 2000 AD #1786
 "Chaos Day", art by Henry Flint, in 2000 AD #1787–1788
 "The Days After", art by Henry Flint, in 2000 AD #1789

A third book, Day of Chaos: Fallout (2014), collected some stories which followed the main story and showed the aftermath of the destruction.

References

External links
Interview with the writer and artists, at comicbookresources.com

"Judge Dredd Day of Chaos - Fourth Faction review @ Upcoming4.me"
"Judge Dredd Day of Chaos - Endgame review @ Upcoming4.me"

Judge Dredd storylines